the Encyclopedia of American Biography, a biographical encyclopedia, by John A. Garraty (ed.) and Jerome L. Sternstein (assoc. ed.) This encyclopedia, published by Harper & Row in 1974, "is more than a storehouse of information. It is also a compendium of informed opinion intended to aid readers who want to know the whys, not merely the whats, about the significant figures of our history."

After the summary of each life which sticks to the facts, follows an article "...attempting to explain why the individual is notable and to provide some sense of what he or she was like as a human being."

New series contents

References

External links
 Hathitrust catalog
 NNDB
 

United States biographical dictionaries
Harper & Row books
1974 non-fiction books